KCFZ-LP is a low-power FM radio station licensed by Creative Fresno that broadcasts a variety format to Fresno, California on 93.3 FM. It went on the air on August 31, 2017.

References

External links

Fresno, California
2017 establishments in California
Radio stations established in 2017
Variety radio stations in the United States
CFZ-LP
CFZ-LP